Aiviekste Parish, is an administrative unit of Aizkraukle Municipality, Latvia. As of 2011 population of Aiviekste Parish is 818 people. Latvian law defines Aiviekste Parish as belonging partly to the Vidzeme region and partly to Latgale.

Towns, villages and settlements of Aiviekste Parish 
Aizpurves
Āpēni
Draudavas
Ezerkrasti
Ģeriņi
Īvāni
Juči
Kriškalni
Ķūģi
Maiļupsala
Mālkalni
Mežezers
Ozolsala

References

Parishes of Latvia
Aizkraukle Municipality
Vidzeme
Latgale